This was the first edition of this event. 

Jiang Xinyu and Tang Qianhui won the title, defeating Mana Ayukawa and Erika Sema in the final, 7–5, 6–4.

Seeds

Draw

References
Main Draw

Jin'an Open - Doubles
Jin'an Open